The Ávila National Park, officially known as Waraira Repano National Park for its indigenous Cariban name, protects part of the Cordillera de la Costa Central mountain range, in the coastal region of central-northern Venezuela.

Culture & traditions 
El Ávila is known as "el pulmón de la ciudad", the lungs of the city, since it serves many different functions for residents of Caracas, the most basic of these being navigation: the peak of El Ávila marks the north of the city. It is home to the longest cable car ride in the world, as well as activities like running, biking, rock climbing, camping, and zip-lining. El Hotel Humboldt as well as many restaurants, including La Chivera, Casa Pakea, El Jardín de Luna, Le Galipanier, Granja Natalia and Tarahumara, are all nestled in the mountain's hills. Every December, the "Cruz de Navidad" is illuminated, a large crucifix high up in the mountain that faces the city and can be seen from very far distances.

Legend of Pacheco 

A common expression amongst Caracas city-dwellers to describe the change in seasons is "Pacheco has arrived," which is a reference to the legend of Pacheco the flower-picker. He was known to be a resident of el Galipán, a region in el Ávila close to the coast that tended to mark the border between the coast's chilly weather and that of the hot, dry weather of the rest of the country. El Galipán was home to some of the most beautiful, unique flowers in the country, and every December Pacheco would make the long trip down the mountain into the city to sell his harvest in the Plaza Bolivar in Caracas. His arrival was often accompanied by the cold December weather, and over time, the expression "Pacheco has arrived" came to mean that the weather is about to get colder.

History
El Ávila was declared a park in 1958, fulfilling an interest in its protection that had been prevalent since the 19th century. With its creation came the protection of the forested mountains that surround Caracas, the capital of Venezuela. These mountains now serve as both a recreational area and as a buffer to pollution and urban expansion. El Ávila has always been an important resource for the inhabitants of Caracas, who have used the area for a variety of activities, some of which have threatened its conservation. After being out of service for 20 years, this cable car was reopened in February 2002.

Biodiversity
This park has a high diversity of fauna and flora. More than 100 butterfly species, approximately 120 mammal species, 20 amphibians, 30 reptiles and 500 bird species (36% of Venezuela avifauna) have been documented. Nine bird species are endemic to Venezuela and three threatened bird species live in this park; one of the most coloured bird specimen in this park is the querrequerre (Cyanocorax yncas). In addition, more than 1,800 plant species from diverse taxonomic groups can be observed. Several of these plants are endemic to the Cordillera de la Costa mountain range with some endemic to the park itself.

Vegetation

The vegetation is of mountain forest, with variations that is distributed according to the height. Between sea level and 200 or 300 meters (and even higher up in the orientation of relief) is the xeric forest, where prevail species like cují (Prosopis juliflora). Between 800–1500 m ombrófilo sub-evergreen forest is characterized by 2-3 arboreal strata and relatively dense undergrowth is located. Among the 1,200 - 3 tree storeys and undergrowth well developed - 2,200 masl ombrófilo evergreen forest with 2 stands. In these forests abundant species of the families of orchids, ferns, bromeliads, aroids, and have reported endemic species of the family Sapindaceae, Melastomataceae, Rubiaceae and Myrtaceae and arborescent ferns and palms (Ceroxylon ceriferum). These forests boast the only extant natural population of the critically endangered Venezuelan walnut tree (Juglans venezuelensis). Presents anthropogenic savannas where predominate species like melao capim (Melinis minutiflora), the bambusillo (Arthrostylidium venezuelae), yellow tara (Oyedaea verbesinoides) and incense (Espeletia neriifolia). In the upper regions of the Silla of Caracas and the Pico Naiguatá is a characteristic vegetation of coastal bush subpáramo, consisting of open shrub of 1–3 m tall with a herbaceous relatively well developed, being the most characteristic species incense or frailejón tree (Libanothamnus nerufolius), Spanish flag (Castilleja fissifolia) and false frailejón (Liabum megacephalum).

Threats
El Ávila can be classified as vulnerable because there is a risk that the diverse threats it faces will increasingly erode its biodiversity unless in the near future constant monitoring occurs. The most immediate threats to the park, forest fires and illegal settlements, are located primarily near Caracas. However, the concentration of resources and vigilance in those areas closest to the city has resulted in more problems in the more isolated northern slope and eastern sector of El Ávila. These areas suffer from a lack of signs, infrastructure and vigilance. Other threats include the presence of exotic plants, the Caracas Aerial Tramway, the Hotel Humboldt and poaching.

Geography

El Ávila National Park is located along the central stretch of the Cordillera de la Costa, at 10° 32' latitude north and between 66° 12' and 67° 01' longitude west (see map). It covers the mountainous regions between the Caribbean Sea and the valleys of Caracas, Guatire, Guarenas and Barlovento. The park contains part of the following states: Vargas (northern slope), Capital District (southern and western slope) and Miranda (eastern slope).

The mountain is accessible by cable car (teleferico), by off-road vehicle, and on foot. In addition to the scenery, one may visit the hacienda, laboratory and mausoleum of Gottfried Knoche; a German-born doctor who was notorious for his experiments in mummification. They are accessible only by footpath.

In the lower areas of the northern side, the vegetation is mainly xerophytes, represented by a variety of cacti, shrubs and spiny species. From , semi-deciduous forests dominate, whereas from  the seasonal semi-deciduous forests are common. Beautiful forests grow along the numerous watercourses that flow on either side of the mountain.

Trails 

There are plenty of trails in El Ávila National Park for outdoor enthusiasts. From low-level routes to high technical complexity, there is a trail for everyone.

The most famous trails are: Los Venados, Sabas Nieves, El Vivero, Los Pinos, Papelón, Rancho Grande, Cachimbo, Miguel Delgado, Lomas del Cuño, El Paraíso, La Julia, Picacho, Piedra del Indio, Lagunazo, Pico Oriental, Pico Occidental, Cabeza de Elefante and Pico Naiguatá.

Gallery

See also 
 Teleférico de Caracas

References

External links

 Parkswatch.org: Information about El Ávila National Park 
 Soundsandcolours.com: "El Ávila National Park: The Protective Lungs of Caracas"
 facebook.com: "Cerro El Avila"

 
National parks of Venezuela
Geography of Caracas
Venezuelan Coastal Range
Geography of Capital District (Venezuela)
Geography of Miranda (state)
Geography of Vargas (state)
1958 establishments in Venezuela
Protected areas established in 1958
Tourist attractions in Caracas